Xandra Velzeboer (born 7 September 2001) is a Dutch short track speed skater.

References

External links

2001 births
Living people
Dutch female short track speed skaters
World Short Track Speed Skating Championships medalists
Olympic short track speed skaters of the Netherlands
Short track speed skaters at the 2022 Winter Olympics
Medalists at the 2022 Winter Olympics
Olympic gold medalists for the Netherlands
Olympic medalists in short track speed skating
21st-century Dutch women